Paria, Bolivia was an important administrative center of the Inca Empire in the late 15th and 16th centuries CE and was the first Spanish settlement in Bolivia, founded in 1535.

Paria is located in Cercado Province and Oruro Department of Bolivia.

Incas

Paria existed as a settlement of the Uru people long before the Inca Empire.  The Inca emperor Topa Inca Yupanqui (ruled 1471-1493) conquered the Paria region while expanding the Inca Empire south from Cuzco.  He selected Paria as capital of Charcas province, a much larger area than what is today called Charcas. The maize crop from Cochabamba to the east passed through Paria en route to Cuzco or was stored in Paria.  Later in the 1520s, soldiers to serve in the Inca military campaigns in the northern Andes gathered in Paria before their journey north.   Paria was located on the royal road (Camino Real) of the Inca which stretched from Quito in the North to the Maule River in present-day Chile.

Paria under the Incas, in the words of a Catholic priest, was "an administrative and military center, a miniature Cuzco with numerous settlements under its jurisdiction, from where the Inca emperor exercised his sovereignty over Qullasuyu [one of the four main parts of the Inca Empire].  It has temples for Inti, the cult of the Sun of the Incas, convents for ñustas (princesses), civil and military buildings, storage silos (qullqas) and lodging places [tambos]."

Spanish

In 1535, the conquistador Diego de Almagro set forth from Cuzco with the goal of conquering land and finding riches in the territory south of Cuzco in what is today Bolivia and Chile. An advance party led by Juan de Saavedra and including Vila Oma, an Inca religious leader, Paullu Inca, the brother of Inca emperor, Manco Inca, Augustianian priests, 150 Spanish soldiers, and hundreds of native soldiers. Arriving at Paria on January 23, 1535, the Spanish destroyed many of the buildings and founded Paria La Nueva (New Paria).  Almagro and the bulk of his army arrived in Paria later that year and proceeded southward to conquer additional lands.  The Augustinian priests who accompanied Saavedrea founded a parish in Paria 

In 1565, the Corregimiento (district) of Paria was created as part of Charcas Province. Paria district existed until 1782. A (probably partial) census of Paria district in the 1570s counted 2,500 households equivalent to a population of approximately 12,500 people.  All those counted were native Andeans although a few Roman Catholic priests were working in the province.

The church in Paria has been declared a National Monument by the Bolivian government.

Ruins

The site is larger than any other known archaeological site in the area, thus strengthening the opinion that this is the site of Paria la Vieja.

References

Populated places in Oruro Department
Inca
Archaeological sites in Bolivia
1535 establishments in the Spanish Empire
Populated places established in 1535
Ruins in Bolivia
History of the Inca civilization
Inca Empire